Sugamo Prison (Sugamo Kōchi-sho, Kyūjitai: ,) was a prison in Tokyo, Japan. It was located in the district of Ikebukuro, which is now part of the Toshima ward of Tokyo, Japan.

History

Sugamo Prison was originally built in 1895, using the prisons of Europe as a model. By the 1930s it became known for housing political prisoners, including many communists and other dissenters who fell foul of the Peace Preservation Laws in the 1930s and 1940s. Allied spies were also incarcerated there, including Richard Sorge who was hanged in the prison on November 7, 1944. The prison also was used to hold captured Allied officers during World War 2 as well as airmen

The prison was not damaged during the bombing of Tokyo in World War II, and was taken over by the Allied occupation forces during the occupation of Japan to house suspected war criminals as they awaited trial before the International Military Tribunal for the Far East. After the conclusion of the trials, Sugamo Prison was used to incarcerate some of the convicted and was the site of the execution of seven inmates sentenced to death by hanging on December 23, 1948. The prison was also the execution site for 51 Japanese war criminals who were condemned in the Yokohama War Crimes Trials. The last 7 executions were carried out on April 7, 1950.

The original compound was only  in size. The construction of exterior fencing expanded the facility to double the original size. After being captured and re-purposed by Allied forces, the facility was operated by the Eighth U.S. Army, although the actual operation of the prison was handled by Japanese personnel. There were approximately 2500 military personnel assigned to duty at the prison, however no more than 500 at any given time. The prison was in operation by American military forces from December 1945 through May 1952. The structure housed some 2000 Japanese war criminals during its operation.

The prisoners ate Japanese food prepared by Japanese personnel and served by the prisoners themselves. There were occasions when former Prime Minister Hideki Tojo served food to all the other class "A" prisoners. Some of the vegetables used in these meals were grown within the compound. On May 31, 1958, the last 18 Japanese war criminals still serving time in Sugamo Prison were paroled.

After the end of the occupation of Japan, Sugamo Prison passed to Japanese civilian government control. Most of the remaining war criminals were pardoned or paroled by the government. In 1962 its function as a prison ended. In 1971 the prison buildings were dismantled.

In 1978, the Sunshine 60 Building, at its completion the tallest skyscraper in Japan, was built on the former site of Sugamo Prison. All that is left to commemorate the prison is a stone on which is engraved, in Japanese, "Pray for Eternal Peace."

Notable inmates 
Iva Toguri D'Aquino: American-Japanese suspected collaborator known as "Tokyo Rose". Sentenced to 10 years in prison in the United States for treason, which she served in the United States. Released in 1956, and pardoned in 1977. Died in 2006.
Minister of Foreign Affairs Yōsuke Matsuoka: Died in prison in 1946, before he could be brought to trial.
Marshal Admiral Osami Nagano: Died in prison during his trial in 1947.
Vice Minister of Munitions Nobusuke Kishi: Ran plundering of China, planned and ran the war, key deputy to Tojo, Later Prime Minister (LDP) 1957–1960: Released after charges dropped in 1948. Died in 1987.
Matsutarō Shōriki, secretary of the Political Police in Tokyo, later media mogul, LDP politician, Chief of the Information Department of the Interior Ministry: Released in 1948 after charges dropped. Died in 1969.
Yoshio Kodama, drug trafficking operations and Intelligence agent in China, rear admiral in the Imperial Japanese Navy, Yakuza head: Released in 1948 after charges dropped. Died in 1984.
Japanese fascist leader Ryoichi Sasakawa: Released in 1948 after charges dropped. Died in 1995.
Ambassador Toshio Shiratori: Died in prison in 1949.
General Yoshijirō Umezu: Chief of the Imperial Japanese Army General Staff. Died in prison in 1949.
Prime Minister Kuniaki Koiso: Also an IJA general and Governor-General of Korea. Died in prison in 1950.
Lieutenant General Shigeru Sawada: Released in 1950. Died in 1980.
Minister of Foreign Affairs Mamoru Shigemitsu: Paroled in 1950, and died in 1957.
Minister of Foreign Affairs Shigenori Tōgō: Died in prison in 1950.
Lieutenant General Isamu Yokoyama: Convicted of having command responsibility for vivisection and other human medical experiments performed at the Kyushu Imperial University on downed Allied airmen. Sentenced to death in 1948, but later reprieved. Died in prison in 1952.
Prime Minister Hiranuma Kiichirō: Paroled in 1952, and died a few months later.
Lieutenant General Sadae Inoue: Paroled in 1953. Died in 1961.
Advisor Kōichi Kido: Paroled in 1955, and died in 1977.
Field Marshal Shunroku Hata: Paroled in 1955, and died in 1962.
General Jirō Minami: Governor-General of Korea. Paroled in 1954, and died in 1955.
General Sadao Araki: Paroled in 1955, and died in 1966.
Admiral Shigetarō Shimada: Minister of the Imperial Japanese Navy. Paroled in 1955, and died in 1976.
Lieutenant General Teiichi Suzuki: Paroled in 1955, and died in 1989.
Minister of Finance Okinori Kaya: Paroled in 1955, and died in 1977.
Lieutenant General Hiroshi Ōshima: Paroled in 1955, and died in 1975.
Lieutenant General Eitaro Uchiyama: Paroled in 1958, and died in 1973.
General Naoki Hoshino: Paroled in 1958, and died in 1978.

Executed inmates 
Hotsumi Ozaki: Executed for treason in 1944.
Richard Sorge: Soviet spy, executed by the Japanese in 1944.
Captain Kaichi Hirate: Permitted the mistreatment and murder of Allied POWs. Executed in 1946.
General Kenji Doihara: Chief of intelligence services in Manchukuo. Executed in 1948.
Prime Minister Kōki Hirota: Executed in 1948.
General Seishirō Itagaki: Japanese war minister. Executed in 1948.
General Heitarō Kimura: Commander of the Japanese Burma Area Army. Executed in 1948.
Lieutenant General Akira Mutō: Chief of staff of the Japanese Fourteenth Area Army. Executed in 1948.
General Hideki Tojo: Commander of Kwantung Army and later the Prime Minister. Executed in 1948.
Toshiaki Mukai and Tsuyoshi Noda: Perpetrators of the contest to kill 100 people using a sword during the Nanjing Massacre. Extradited to China and executed in 1948.
Major General Yoshitaka Kawane and Colonel Kurataro Hirano: Convicted of having command responsibility in the Bataan Death March. Executed in 1949.
Lieutenant Sadaaki Konishi: Convicted of torturing prisoners in a prison camp in the Philippines. Executed in 1949.
Lieutenant General Tasuku Okada: Ordered the massacre of 38 U.S. POWs. Executed in 1949.

See also

Landsberg Prison in Bavaria, Germany
Spandau Prison in West Berlin

References

Buildings and structures in Toshima
1895 establishments in Japan
1971 disestablishments in Japan
Defunct prisons in Japan
History of Tokyo
Occupied Japan
Japan in World War II
Military prisons